Kaylee (and its various spellings) is a given name, most often for females. The name is a modern English combination of the name elements Kay and Lee.

It was a popular name in the United States in the latter part of the 20th century and the early 21st century, reaching its height of popularity in 2009, when it ranked 26th among the most popular names for newborn girls. It has since declined in popularity, but remained among the top 150 names for American girls in 2020. Many variant spellings of the name are also among the most popular names for American girls. 

Notable people and characters with these given names include:

Caileigh 

 Caileigh Filmer (born 1996), Canadian Olympic rower

Caleigh 

 Caleigh Peters, American studio executive and singer-songwriter

Kailee 

 Kailee Dunn, Miss Washington 2014
 Kailee Moore, American singer-songwriter known professionally as Kailee Morgue
 Kailee Wong, American football linebacker

Kaleigh 

 Kaleigh Cronin (born 1989), American actress and singer
 Kaleigh Fratkin (born 1992), Canadian ice hockey player
 Kaleigh Gilchrist (born 1992), American surfer and water polo player
 Kaleigh Grainger (born 1986), British unicyclist
 Kaleigh Kurtz (born 1994), American soccer player
 Kaleigh Quennec (born 1998), Canadian-Swiss Olympic ice hockey player
 Kaleigh Rafter (born 1986), Canadian Olympic softball player
 Kaleigh Riehl (born 1996), American soccer player

Kaylee 
 Kaylee Bryant (born 1997), American actress and model
 Kaylee Dakers (born 1991), Canadian breaststroke swimmer
 Kaylee DeFer (born 1986), American actress
 Kaylee Frye, a character from the TV series Firefly and Serenity
 Kaylee Hartung (born 1985), American television journalist

Kayleigh 
 Kayleigh Chetcuti (born 2000), Maltese footballer
 Kayleigh Gibbs (née Crowe), a character on Emmerdale
 Kayleigh Gilbert, South African actress
 Kayleigh Green (born 1988), British footballer
 Kayleigh Haywood, British murder victim
 Kayleigh Hines (born 1991), English footballer
 Kayleigh McEnany (born 1988), American political commentator and writer
 Kayleigh McKee (born 1994), American voice actress
 Kayleigh Morton, a fictional character on Coronation Street
 Kayleigh Pearson (born 1985), English model
 Kayleigh O'Reilly, semi-finalist in the Miss Earth 2009 pageant
 Kayleigh Rose (born 1998), American singer and songwriter known professionally as Chappel Roan
 Kayleigh Yeoman, participant on Operation Transformation

Kayli 

 Kayli Barker (born 1997), American race car driver
 Kayli Carter (born 1993), American actress
 Kayli Mills (born 1994), American voice actress

Kaylie 

 Kaylie Buck (born 2000), Canadian Olympic snowboarder
 Kaylie Hooper, character in American TV comedy series 30 Rock
 Kaylie Jones (born 1960), American writer

See also 
 Caylee (name)
 Cayley (surname)
 Kailey, includes Cailey
 Kaley (disambiguation)
 Kayleigh (disambiguation), includes list of people with surname Kayleigh
 Kayla (name), similar female given names with different etymologies

References 

English feminine given names